Érik Gregorio Pérez Ruvalcaba (born November 19, 1989) is a Mexican mixed martial artist who competes in the Bantamweight division of the Bellator MMA promotion.

A professional competitor since 2008, he has competed for Shark Fights, BAMMA, UFC and Combate Americas.

Personal life
Érik Pérez was born in México. Pérez grew from a family of sportsmen; his older brother Jorge Pérez is a professional boxer, while his brothers Iván Pérez, and Jair Pérez both are fellow mixed martial artists. Érik, Iván, and Jair all three fought together in Combate Americas.

Mixed martial arts career

Ultimate Fighting Championship
Upon his permanent move to United States, Érik Pérez established a full-time training camp at Jackson's MMA in Albuquerque, New Mexico. Érik Pérez is managed by VFD Sports Marketing

Pérez faced John Albert on June 1, 2012 at The Ultimate Fighter 15 Finale replacing Byron Bloodworth who was removed from the bout. Pérez won the fight via controversial armbar submission as Albert did not appear to verbally submit or tap out but the fight was stopped by referee Kim Winslow.

Pérez next faced Ken Stone on August 11, 2012 at UFC 150. He won via first-round KO in 17 seconds. With this win, Pérez obtained the fastest Bantamweight knockout in UFC and WEC Bantamweight history, beating Damacio Page's 18-second KO over Marcos Galvao.

Pérez fought Byron Bloodworth on December 29, 2012 at UFC 155. He won the fight via TKO in the first round.

Pérez was expected to face Johnny Bedford on April 27, 2013 at UFC 159.  However, Pérez pulled out of the bout just days before the event citing an injury and was replaced by Bryan Caraway.

Pérez faced Takeya Mizugaki on August 28, 2013 at UFC Fight Night 27 He lost the fight via split decision.

Pérez next faced Edwin Figueroa at UFC 167. He won the fight via unanimous decision.

Pérez faced Bryan Caraway on June 7, 2014 at UFC Fight Night 42. He lost the fight via rear-naked choke submission in the second round.

Pérez was expected to face Marcus Brimage on November 15, 2014 at UFC 180.  However, Pérez pulled out of the bout in mid-October citing a shoulder injury.

Pérez was briefly linked to a fight with Damian Stasiak on November 21, 2015 at The Ultimate Fighter Latin America 2 Finale. However, Stasiak was removed from the bout and replaced by Taylor Lapilus. He won the fight by unanimous decision.

Pérez next faced Francisco Rivera on July 30, 2016 at UFC 201. He won the back-and-forth fight by unanimous decision.

Pérez faced Felipe Arantes on November 5, 2016 at The Ultimate Fighter Latin America 3 Finale. He was awarded a split decision victory.
Perez signed with Combate Americas on October 31, 2017 after fighting out his contract with the UFC.

Combate Americas
Following his departure from the UFC, Pérez signed a multi-fight contract with Combate Americas. On March 15, 2018 it was announced that Pérez would be fighting against top-ranked fighter in Texas, David "DJ" Fuentes. The fight took place on April 20, and Erik won the fight by knockout.

Pérez was expected to headline Combate Americas Mexico vs. USA against John Castañeda on October 13, 2018, but the bout was postponed to a later date because Castaneda caught staph infection.

Pérez then headlined Combate Americas Combate Monterrey on November 17, 2018 against Andres Ayala. He won the fight via rear-naked choke in the first round.

Bellator MMA
Following a two-fight stint at Combate Americas, Pérez signed a multi-fight deal with Bellator MMA.

Pérez made his promotional debut against Toby Misech at Bellator 236 on December 20, 2019. He lost the fight via knockout in the first round.

Pérez faced Josh Hill at Bellator 244 on August 21, 2020. He lost the fight by unanimous decision.
 
Pérez was expected to face Brian Moore at Bellator 258 on May 7, 2021. However, Moore tested positive for COVID and pulled out of the bout. He was replaced by Blaine Shutt. Pérez won the bout via unanimous decision.

Pérez was scheduled to face Brett Johns on October 16, 2021 at Bellator 268. However on October 5, it was announced that Perez was injured and the bout was scrapped.

Pérez, replacing Jared Scoggins, was scheduled to face Cee Jay Hamilton on April 22, 2022 at Bellator 278. Pérez in turn pulled out of the bout and Hamilton was not rescheduled, instead being paid his show money, despite not weighing in or fighting.

Pérez faced Enrique Barzola on March 10, 2023 at Bellator 292. He lost the fight by unanimous decision.

Championships and accomplishments

Mixed martial arts 
Ultimate Fighting Championship
Fastest knockout in bantamweight history (0:17)
Second best takedown accuracy in bantamweight history (55.9%)
Tenth best significant strike defense in bantamweight history (66.7%)
Sixth most strikes landed in bantamweight history (666)
Ranked eighth for least strikes absorbed per minute in bantamweight history (2.09)
Fourth most takedowns landed in bantamweight history (19)

Mixed martial arts record

|-
|Loss
|align=center|20–9
|Enrique Barzola
|Decision (unanimous)
|Bellator 292
|
|align=center|3
|align=center|5:00
|San Jose, California, United States
|
|-
|Win
|align=center| 20–8
|Blaine Shutt
|Decision (unanimous)
|Bellator 258
|
|align=center|3
|align=center|5:00
|Uncasville, Connecticut, United States
|
|-
| Loss
|align=center|19–8
|Josh Hill
|Decision (unanimous)
|Bellator 244
|
|align=center|3
|align=center|5:00
|Uncasville, Connecticut, United States
|
|-
|Loss
|align=center|19–7
|Toby Misech
|KO (punches)
|Bellator 235
|
|align=center|1
|align=center|0:54
|Honolulu, Hawaii, United States
|  
|-
|Win
|align=center|19–6
|Andres Ayala
|Submission (rear-naked choke)
|Combate Americas - Combate Monterrey
|
|align=center|1
|align=center|3:39
|Monterrey, Nuevo León
|  
|-
|Win
|align=center|18–6
|David Fuentes
|KO (punches)
|Combate Americas - Combate Estrellas 2
|
|align=center|3
|align=center|1:22
|Monterrey, Nuevo León
|  
|-
|Win
|align=center|17–6
|Felipe Arantes
|Decision (split)
|The Ultimate Fighter Latin America 3 Finale: dos Anjos vs. Ferguson
|
|align=center|3
|align=center|5:00
|Mexico City, Mexico
|  
|-
|Win
|align=center|16–6
|Francisco Rivera
|Decision (unanimous)
|UFC 201 
|
|align=center|3
|align=center|5:00
|Atlanta, Georgia, United States
|
|-
| Win
| align=center| 15–6
| Taylor Lapilus 
| Decision (unanimous)
| The Ultimate Fighter Latin America 2 Finale: Magny vs. Gastelum
| 
| align=center| 3
| align=center| 5:00
| Monterrey, Mexico
| 
|-
| Loss
| align=center| 14–6
| Bryan Caraway
| Submission (rear-naked choke)
| UFC Fight Night: Henderson vs. Khabilov
| 
| align=center| 2
| align=center| 1:52
| Albuquerque, New Mexico, United States
| 
|-
| Win
| align=center| 14–5
| Edwin Figueroa
| Decision (unanimous)
| UFC 167
| 
| align=center| 3 
| align=center| 5:00 
| Las Vegas, Nevada, United States
| 
|-
| Loss
| align=center| 13–5
| Takeya Mizugaki
| Decision (split)
| UFC Fight Night: Condit vs. Kampmann 2
| 
| align=center| 3
| align=center| 5:00
| Indianapolis, Indiana, United States
| 
|-
| Win
| align=center| 13–4
| Byron Bloodworth
| TKO (punches)
| UFC 155
| 
| align=center| 1
| align=center| 3:50
| Las Vegas, Nevada, United States
| 
|-
| Win
| align=center| 12–4
| Ken Stone
| KO (punch)
| UFC 150
| 
| align=center| 1
| align=center| 0:17
| Denver, Colorado, United States
| Fastest knockout in UFC bantamweight history
|-
| Win
| align=center| 11–4
| John Albert
| Submission (armbar)
| The Ultimate Fighter: Live Finale
| 
| align=center| 1
| align=center| 4:18
| Las Vegas, Nevada, United States
| 
|-
| Win
| align=center| 10–4
| Paul McVeigh
| Decision (unanimous)
| BAMMA 8
| 
| align=center| 3
| align=center| 5:00
| Nottingham, England
| 
|-
| Win
| align=center| 9–4
| James Brum
| Submission (rear-naked choke)
| BAMMA 7
| 
| align=center| 1
| align=center| 3:31
| Birmingham, England
|Catchweight (140 lbs) bout.
|-
| Win
| align=center| 8–4
| Douglas Frey
| Decision (unanimous)
| Shark Fights 17: Horwich vs. Rosholt 2
| 
| align=center| 3
| align=center| 5:00
| Frisco, Texas, United States
|Catchweight (150 lbs) bout.
|-
| Win
| align=center| 7–4
| Jesse Thorton
| Submission (rear-naked choke)
| STFC 15: Nature of the Beast
| 
| align=center| 2
| align=center| 2:34
| McAllen, Texas, United States
| 
|-
| Win
| align=center| 6–4
| France Atala
| Submission (rear-naked choke)
| Triple A Promotions
| 
| align=center| 1
| align=center| 1:53
| Laredo, Texas, United States
| 
|-
| Loss
| align=center| 5–4
| Jason Sampson
| Decision (split)
| STFC: 9/3/10
| 
| align=center| 3
| align=center| 5:00
| McAllen, Texas, United States
| 
|-
| Loss
| align=center| 5–3
| David Fuentes
| Submission (armbar)
| STFC 11: Night of Champions
| 
| align=center| 3
| align=center| 3:01
| McAllen, Texas, United States
| 
|-
| Win
| align=center| 5–2
| Jeremiah Castillo
| Submission (armbar)
| SCA: Duke City Fall Brawl 2
| 
| align=center| 1
| align=center| 2:23
| Albuquerque, New Mexico, United States
| 
|-
| Win
| align=center| 4–2
| Fabian Jacquez
| Submission (rear-naked choke)
| DCMMAS: Duke City MMA Series 2
| 
| align=center| 1
| align=center| 0:55
| Albuquerque, New Mexico, United States
| 
|-
| Win
| align=center| 3–2
| Albert Martinez
| TKO (punches)
| STFC 6: Evolution
| 
| align=center| 1
| align=center| 2:17
| Odessa, Texas, United States
| 
|-
| Win
| align=center| 2–2
| Sabino Becerra
| Submission (triangle choke)
| STFC 4: Fuentes vs. King
| 
| align=center| 1
| align=center| 3:29
| McAllen, Texas, United States
| 
|-
| Win
| align=center| 1–2
| Josh Scales
| TKO (punches)
| STFC 3: War Zone
| 
| align=center| 1
| align=center| 1:09
| McAllen, Texas, United States
| 
|-
| Loss
| align=center| 0–2
| Alfredo Morales
| Decision (split)
| Warriors Fighting Championship
| 
| align=center| 3
| align=center| 3:00
| Mexico City, Mexico
| 
|-
| Loss
| align=center| 0–1
| Tim Snyder
| Decision (split)
| STFC 2: Aftershock
| 
| align=center| 3
| align=center| N/A
| Edinburg, Texas, United States
|

See also
 List of current Bellator fighters
 List of male mixed martial artists

References

External links
 
 

Bantamweight mixed martial artists
Mexican male mixed martial artists
Ultimate Fighting Championship male fighters
Living people
1989 births
People from Guadalupe, Nuevo León
Sportspeople from Nuevo León